Graham Marshall is a former association football player who represented New Zealand at international level.

Marshall made his full All Whites debut, a 3–0 win over Singapore on 21 February 1996 and ended his international playing career with 10 A-international caps to his credit, his final cap an appearance in a 1–3 loss to South Korea on 25 January 1997.

References 

Year of birth missing (living people)
Living people
New Zealand association footballers
New Zealand international footballers
Association footballers not categorized by position